Broadway, previously known as 2nd Street West, is a major north-south city route in Minot, North Dakota. U.S. Route 83 (US 83) follows Broadway through the city.

Commercial zones line Broadway's entire length, aside from a handful of apartment complexes. Along its route, it intersects with the US 2/US 52 bypass, Burdick Expressway, and University Avenue, among others. Broadway also travels adjacent to the Minot International Airport.

The street has four lanes of traffic throughout the city, with an additional center turn lane between Burdick Expressway and the US 2/US 52 bypass.

Minot, North Dakota
Roads in North Dakota
U.S. Route 83
Transportation in Ward County, North Dakota